Verkhneketsky District  is an administrative and municipal district (raion), one of the sixteen in Tomsk Oblast, Russia. It is located in the northeast of the oblast. Its administrative center is the urban locality (a work settlement) of Bely Yar. Population: 17,052 (2010 Census);  The population of Bely Yar accounts for 46.9% of the district's total population.

References

Notes

Sources

Districts of Tomsk Oblast